Mariscal Sucre International Airport  is an international airport serving Quito, Ecuador. It is the busiest airport in Ecuador and one of the busiest airports in South America. It also served as the main hub for TAME, Ecuador's flag-carrier, before the airline was liquidated by the Ecuadorian government in 2020. The airport opened in February 2013 and replaced the 53-year old airport of the same name. The airport is named after independence leader Antonio José de Sucre. It is rated as the only 5-star airport in the Western Hemisphere by Skytrax.

Location 
The location was chosen in order to expand the capacity of the city's airport.

The old airport posed enormous risks because it was located in the middle of a mountainous city with high wind currents. It could no longer be expanded to accommodate larger aircraft or increased air traffic, and had been the scene of numerous incidents and accidents during the latter years of its operation.

History 

Construction began in 2006. A re-negotiation of the financing contract for the airport was signed on 9 August 2010.

At about 6:19 a.m. on July 2, 2012, an American Airlines Boeing 757 landed at the new airport with about 100 passengers on board. The flight was used to obtain the operating certificate for track tests. It also allowed testing of the performance of the electronics mounted for handling and transporting luggage and check-in counters for passengers and baggage. The aircraft departed from the existing Mariscal Sucre International Airport with Quito's Mayor, Augusto Barrera, local authorities, aviation staff, and the media to pre-test boarding procedures at 5:30 a.m., later taking off at about 6:10 a.m. After a 9-minute flight, the flight landed at the new Airport. After landing and subsequent taxiing through taxiway 1 of the new airport, the airplane was greeted with a water cannon salute from two fire trucks.

Subsequently, visitors toured the facilities of the passenger terminal building and the north and south ends of the runway. After the tour, Mayor Barrera and authorities gave a press conference. There, the Mayor also stated that the airport would be ready at its inauguration, as well as enhancements to the E-35, and Interoceanic highways. "This is a day of joy and optimism for the city. At this point all you get joining goodwill," the official said adding that the social energy that the city should serve to build and make things.

Mayor Barrera also stated that this airport will be a remarkable leap in economic development of the city of Quito and that the strategic alliance with Quiport achieved with the resources generated by the new airport will be for all the people of Quito. "We are checking with the facts that transformation we're doing for the Quito we crave" he said. The mayor also reported that when the Mariscal Sucre Airport closes, construction of a new park will begin at the current site, and within days the bidding will begin for the 1st phase of the planned Quito Metro, as well as for the construction of a new bridge over the Chiche river.

The official inauguration was postponed from October, 2012, citing the progress of improvements to various access routes, the holiday season, and other factors. The new airport commenced operations on 20 February 2013 following the closure of the old airport the night before. The first flights scheduled to arrive at the new airport were TAME flight 302 from Guayaquil (domestic), and LAN flight 2590 from Lima, Peru (international). Arrival times were scheduled for 9:00 and 9:30 a.m. respectively.

Airlines and destinations

Passenger

Notes:
: Air Europa's flight from Quito to Madrid makes a stop in Guayaquil.
: KLM's flight from Quito to Amsterdam makes a stop in Guayaquil.

Cargo

Statistics

Annual traffic

Top destinations

See also
Transport in Ecuador
List of airports in Ecuador

References

External links
 New Quito International Airport: Main Information. Quiport Corporation. Retrieved April 12, 2009.
 New Airport: A Door to Development. Corpaq - Quito Airport Corporation. Retrieved April 12, 2009.
 
 Wikivoyage: Tababela

Airports in Ecuador
Transport in Quito
Buildings and structures in Pichincha Province
Airports established in 2013
2013 establishments in Ecuador